Alfred Crisp (19 May 1843 – 29 May 1917) was an Australian politician.

Crisp was born in Hobart in Tasmania in 1843. In 1886 he was elected to the Tasmanian House of Assembly, representing the seat of North Hobart. In 1897 he was elected for the multi-member Hobart constituency, but he was defeated in 1900. He died in 1917 in Hobart.

References

1844 births
1917 deaths
Members of the Tasmanian House of Assembly